Les Djinns may refer to:

Les Djinns (poem), poem by Victor Hugo
Les Djinns, Op. 12, choral work by Gabriel Fauré
Les Djinns, Op. 45, symphonic poem based on the Hugo poem César Franck 1884
Les Djinns, Op. 35, work for baritone by Louis Vierne
Les Djinns Singers French choral group of the sixties